Heppnerographa carchiana is a species of moth of the family Tortricidae. It is found in Ecuador.

The wingspan is about 13 mm. The ground colour of the forewings is whitish, partially suffused with brownish and weakly tinged with ferruginous in the middle area. The markings are pale brown. The hindwings are brownish cream, but much browner along the margins.

References

Moths described in 1999
Heppnerographa